Jo-Ann Mapson (born March 29, 1952) is an American author. She is the author of twelve works of fiction, set mainly in the American Southwest.

Biography
She was born on March 29, 1952 in Pasadena, California, and now lives in Anchorage, Alaska. She attended Johnston College at the University of Redlands, graduated with a B.A. in English/Creative Writing from California State University Long Beach, and received her M.F.A. in both Poetry and Prose from Vermont College in 1992.

Mapson’s novels include series books—Hank & Chloe; Loving Chloe; Bad Girl Creek; Along Came Mary; Goodbye, Earl, as well as stand-alone novels.  Their subject matter concerns women, friendship, love and child rearing and their families. An example of this is the 1996 novel, Shadow Ranch: A Novel which focuses on the women of the "Carpenter Clan" and the so-called curse which effects all members of the family over several generations. It shows the women overcoming the problems by love, dedication and a focus on the Carpenter Clan.

Her second novel, Blue Rodeo, was made into a CBS movie for television starring Ann-Margret and Kris Kristofferson.  In 2006 Simon & Schuster published The Owl & Moon Café.

She has taught English and Creative Writing at Orange Coast College, University of California Irvine extension, California State University Fullerton extension, Matanuska-Susitna College and now teaches in the M.F.A. Program in Writing at the University of Alaska Anchorage. She is also a graduate advisor for Prescott College’s MAP Program. Her former writing students (now published) include: Christina Adams, Judy Alexander, Earlene Fowler, Judi Hendricks, Joyce Weatherford.

Her papers are being collected in Boston University’s Twentieth Century Authors Archive in "The Jo-Ann Mapson Collection".

Bibliography
  Spooking the Horses (poems) chapbook
  Fault Line (stories) (1990) 
  Hank & Chloe (1993)  
  Blue Rodeo (1994)  
  Shadow Ranch (1996) 
  Loving Chloe (1998) 
  The Wilder Sisters (1999) 
  Bad Girl Creek (2001) 
  Along Came Mary (2003) 
  Goodbye, Earl (2004) 
  The Owl & Moon Café (2006) 
  Solomon's Oak (2010) 
  Finding Casey (2012) 
  Owen's Daughter (2014)

References

External links
 

20th-century American novelists
20th-century American women writers
21st-century American novelists
21st-century American women writers
American women novelists
California State University, Fullerton faculty
California State University, Long Beach alumni
Living people
People from Pasadena, California
People from Matanuska-Susitna Borough, Alaska
University of Alaska Anchorage faculty
University of California, Irvine faculty
University of Redlands alumni
Vermont College of Fine Arts alumni
Writers from Anchorage, Alaska
Writers from California
1952 births
American women academics